Events from the year 2004 in Kuwait.

Incumbents
Emir: Jaber Al-Ahmad Al-Jaber Al-Sabah
Prime Minister: Sabah Al-Ahmad Al-Jaber Al-Sabah

Events

 Kuwaiti Premier League 2003–04.
 Kuwaiti Premier League 2004–05.

Establishments

 American University of Kuwait.

References

 
Kuwait
Kuwait
Years of the 21st century in Kuwait
2000s in Kuwait